The 1916 United States presidential election in North Dakota took place on November 7, 1916. All contemporary forty-eight states were part of the 1916 United States presidential election. Voters chose five electors to the Electoral College, who voted for president and vice president.

North Dakota was won narrowly by incumbent President Woodrow Wilson (D–New Jersey), running with incumbent Vice President Thomas R. Marshall, with 47.84% of the popular vote, against Associate Justice of the U.S. Supreme Court Charles Evans Hughes (R–New York), running with former Vice President Charles W. Fairbanks, with 46.34% of the popular vote. Apart from the state’s first presidential election in 1892, this is the closest presidential result on record in North Dakota, although the state was only the sixth-closest of the 1916 election.

Wilson had previously won North Dakota four years earlier. , this is the last time that North Dakota voted for a different candidate than neighboring South Dakota, with North Dakota being won by Wilson and South Dakota being won by Hughes.

Results

Results by county

See also
 United States presidential elections in North Dakota

References

1916
North Dakota
1916 North Dakota elections